Kilometer zero or kilometre zero may refer to:

Kilometre zero, a particular location from which distances are traditionally measured
Kilometre Zero (Bucharest), a monument in Bucharest, Romania
Zero Kilometre Stone, a monument in Budapest, Hungary

Film
Kilometer Zero (film), a 2007 Russian film
Km. 0, a 2000 Spanish film
Kilomètre Zéro, a 2005 French-Kurdish film

Other uses
Kilometer Zero, a collective of international artists and writers

See also
 Kilometre
 Zero (disambiguation)
 KM (disambiguation)
 0 (disambiguation)
 Zero Mile (disambiguation)